Fevipiprant (INN; code name QAW039) is a drug being developed by Novartis which acts as a selective, orally available antagonist of the prostaglandin D2 receptor 2 (DP2 or CRTh2).

, it is in phase III clinical trials for the treatment of asthma.

On Monday, December 16, 2019, Switzerland-based Novartis officially announced that it was jettisoning fevipiprant from its development program, given that the medicine has failed in two additional clinical trials in patients with moderate-to-severe asthma.  The firm said that it had hoped fevipiprant would be a billion-dollar-selling asthma drug.

See also
 Prostaglandin DP2 receptor
 Setipiprant

References

Antiasthmatic drugs
Receptor antagonists
Benzosulfones
Carboxylic acids
Trifluoromethyl compounds